Saul Tendler a British pharmacy academic, his research area is biomolecular structure and interaction. He is currently the Deputy Vice-Chancellor and Provost of the University of York.

Career and background
His academic background is Pharmacy, he studied at Manchester University (1979–82) and subsequently obtained his PhD at Aston University (1983–86). Following this, he was an MRC Training Fellow at NIMR Mill Hill.

He was made a professor at the University of Nottingham, and  then Head of their School of Pharmacy. With colleagues he established Nottingham's Laboratory of Biophysics and Surface Analysis (LBSA). He was subsequently appointed Nottingham's Pro-Vice-Chancellor (PVC) for Teaching and Learning and then PVC for Research.

He joined the University of York in 2015.  From 2018 to 2019, he was the Acting Vice-Chancellor at York.

He was awarded a DSc from the University of Nottingham in 2007.

External activities
He has been a member of a number of national bodies including: UK Healthcare Education Advisory Committee (2013–19), Non-Executive Director of Nottinghamshire Healthcare NHS Trust (2010–15), HEFCE/UUK/GuildHE Quality in Higher Education Group (2010–13), HEFCE Strategic Committee for Research (2003–08), Director of BioCity Nottingham Ltd, (2006-2012). He has been the Chair of York Science Park Ltd since 2017.

References

1961 births
Living people
Fellows of the Royal Society of Chemistry
Academics of the University of York
British pharmacologists
Academics of the University of Nottingham